When the Robbers Came to Cardamom Town is a 1955 Norwegian children's book written and illustrated by Thorbjørn Egner, which tells the story of Kardemomme by (Cardamom Town). It is considered one of the most important works in Norwegian children's literature. The book includes many songs which are connected to the story. The story has been adapted into a play and television program. The criminologist Nils Christie considered that Egner had contributed significantly to criminology in Norway due in part to this book.

Plot summary 
The book is about the peaceful town of Kardemomme and the people there, as well as the only characters which stir up serious trouble. They are the three robbers, Casper, Jasper and Jonathan who live outside the town and regularly enter to steal the things they need. The robbers get arrested and are treated well in jail. In the end they are reformed, and in the final chapter, they become the heroes of the day when they extinguish a fire in the tower of the town. Finally, Casper becomes the town's fireman, Jasper becomes the town's circus manager and Jonathan becomes a baker.

Characters

Main characters 
 The Robbers (Casper, Jasper, and Jonathan) — loud, prone to quarreling with each other, and live very cluttered. They live in a strange house, with a kind lion to protect them.
 Constable Bastian — the cheerful policeman who is concerned in making sure that everyone is happy.
 Aunt Sophie — a middle-aged woman who is the aunt of Camomilla. Sophie is extremely strict, and the only song she sings is "Aunt Sophie's angry song", where she expresses dismay over the horrid state of affairs in the town, and disdain for a number of the people. Regarding Bastian, she sings ("I know Policemen Bastian is always very kind, but conscious constables have punishment in mind."). However, Sophie is also a sympathetic character, well-organized and capable of giving sympathy to those who deserve it.
 Tobias — the old wise man in the tower with a long beard. His job is to give the town's weather forecast from the balcony of the tower in which he lives.

Minor characters 
 Kamomilla — Aunt Sophie's young niece. She likes to play the piano.
 Tommy — the young son of the town orchestra's French horn player.
 Enoksson the Tram driver — runs the city's tram. He also plays in the city orchestra.
 Simonsson the barber — the town's barber. He also plays the clarinet in the city orchestra.
 The butcher, the baker and the merchant — after they eventually get tired of the robberies, they decide to stop the robbers once and for all.
 Polly Parrot — a parrot who sings at the Cardemom Fair.
 Camel — a camel who sings at the Cardemom Fair.

Music
The music, Kardemommeviser, was released on EP in 1955 and LP in 1975.

Theme park

The setting of Kardemomme by was made into part of a theme park in Kristiansand Zoo in 1991. Thorbjørn Egner lived to see the theme park under construction, but not to see it completed.

Law
Law of Cardamom is the only law in Cardamom Town. The law is simple and liberal:

One shall not bother others,
one shall be nice and kind,
otherwise one may do as one pleases.

Songs
 (Constable Bastian's song)
 (Song about the weather)
 (The tram in Cardemom Town)
 (The robbers' song)
 (Little Kamomilla playing)
 (The Cardamom song)
 (The talking camel)
 (Aunt Sophie's angry song)
 (The capturing of the robber's song)
 (The robbers' exploration song)
 (The robber's song about Aunt Sophie)
 (Sophie's angry song in the robber's house)
 (The robbers' cleaning song)
 (The happy robbers)
 (The horse dance)
 (The parrot from America)
 (Hooray song for Tobias)
 (Mrs. Bastian's song)
 (The robbers' cleaning song in prison)
 (The barber song)
 (Hooray song for the robbers)

Some of the songs from the book/play were issued on the EP album  in 1955. The 1975 album  (with Egner playing the Jonathan character) was awarded the Spellemann award.

Film adaptation
The book was made into a film in 1988, directed by Bente Erichsen.

Publication history
First introduced in radio programs for children (Barnetimen for de minste) in 1955
1955, Norway, ? (ISBN NA), pub date ? ? 1955, hardback (first edition)
1956, play version
1976, US, Anchorage Press, pub date ? December 1976, paperback (first US English ed.) (as People and Robbers of Cardemon Town - L. Berg & E. Ramsden translators) 
1993, Norway, J W Cappelens Forlag AS, pub date ? ? 1993, paperback (as When the Robbers came to Cardamom Town - Anthony Barnett translator)

References

External links

IMDB entry for the movie
Theme park site (in Norwegian)

1955 children's books
Children's novels
Children's theatre
20th-century Norwegian novels
Norwegian plays
Utopian fiction
J.W. Cappelens Forlag books
Norwegian children's literature
Norway in fiction
Plays set in Norway
1955 novels